Margaret Adele Fairley born Margaret Adele Keeling (1885–1968) was a British-born Canadian writer, educator, and political activist. From 1936
until her death, she was a member of the Communist Party of Canada (CPC). She was deported from the USA for her politics and there is a park named for her in Toronto.

Life
Fairley was born in Bradford, Yorkshire, UK Her mother was Henrietta Frances (born Gedge) and her father was the Reverend William Hulton Keeling who transformed Northampton and Bradford Grammar School. Her elder sister was Dorothy Keeling a leading social worker.

At a time when the university did not grant degrees to women, she studied at Oxford and finished with a "first" in English. She became tutor in English at St Hilda's College, and in 1912 was appointed advisor to women students at the University of Alberta in Edmonton, Canada. She held this position only for a year, before marrying Barker Fairley, a fellow Yorkshireman and professor of modern languages. The U of A granted her a Bachelor of Arts degree. After the birth of Joan (Hall) and Tom, the family moved to Toronto, where they had Elizabeth, William and Ann (Schabas) where she lived until her death 1968.

Her first book was an edition of poems (Coleridge Poems, 1794-1807, published in 1910). It includes a 49-page biographical essay introducing Coleridge "as a Poet of Nature and Romance." She was editor from 1952 to 1956 of New Frontiers, a journal published by the Labor-Progressive Party of Canada, and two other books:
The Spirit of Canadian Democracy (1945)
Selected Writings of William Lyon Mackenzie (1960)

She moved in the same intellectual circles as historian Stanley Ryerson and poet Dorothy Livesay.

In 1949, while attending the Cultural and Scientific Conference for World Peace at the Waldorf-Astoria Hotel in New York City, she was deported from the United States. She died in Toronto, Ontario, Canada at the age of 82.

On June 23, 1972, the City of Toronto named a park after her at the corner of Brunswick Avenue and Ulster Street. The City provided a plaque with her name on a granite boulder. Later, family and friends raised the money to erect a bronze bust.

Some of her manuscripts are in the collection of the Thomas Fisher Rare Book Library, University of Toronto.

Her son-in-law is a musician Ezra Schabas and her grandson is an academic William Schabas as is her granddaughter Margaret Schabas.

References

External links
, University of Toronto Bulletin.

20th-century Canadian poets
Members of the Communist Party of Canada
Canadian women poets
People from Bradford
University of Alberta alumni
1885 births
1968 deaths
20th-century Canadian women writers
Communist women writers
20th-century Canadian historians
Canadian women historians
English emigrants to Canada